The 1994–95 Indiana Hoosiers men's basketball team represented Indiana University. Their head coach was Bobby Knight, who was in his 24th year. The team played its home games in  Assembly Hall in Bloomington, Indiana, and was a member of the Big Ten Conference.

The Hoosiers finished the regular season with an overall record of 19–12 and a conference record of 11–7, finishing 3rd in the Big Ten Conference. The Hoosiers were invited to participate in the 1995 NCAA tournament. However, IU made a quick exit with a loss in the first round to Missouri.

Roster

Schedule/Results

|-
!colspan=8| Regular Season
|-

|-
!colspan=8| NCAA tournament

References

Indiana Hoosiers men's basketball seasons
Indiana
Indiana
1994 in sports in Indiana
1995 in sports in Indiana